The 1978–79 season was Newport County's 17th consecutive season in the Football League Fourth Division and their 51st season overall in the Football League.

Season review

Results summary

Results by round

Fixtures and results

Fourth Division

FA Cup

Football League Cup

Welsh Cup

League table

P = Matches played; W = Matches won; D = Matches drawn; L = Matches lost; F = Goals for; A = Goals against; GD = Goal difference; Pts = Points

External links
 Newport County 1978-1979 : Results
 Newport County football club match record: 1979
 Welsh Cup 1978/79

1978-79
English football clubs 1978–79 season
1978–79 in Welsh football